The University Center of Guantánamo (CUG) is a public university located in Guantánamo, Cuba. It was founded on May 28, 1997 and is organized in 4 faculties.

Organization

These are the 4 faculties in which the university is divided into:

 Faculty of Social Sciences and Humanities
 Faculty of Economic Sciences
 Faculty of Informatic Engineering
 Faculty of Laws

See also 

Education in Cuba
List of universities in Cuba
 Guantánamo

References

External links
 University of Guantánamo Website 

Guantánamo
Educational institutions established in 1997
Buildings and structures in Guantánamo
1997 establishments in Cuba